Bibractella is a monotypic genus of grasshoppers in the subfamily Catantopinae and tribe Gereniini.  

The single species Bibractella sugonjaevi has only been recorded from Vietnam to date.

References

External links 
 

Acrididae genera
Catantopinae 
Orthoptera of Indo-China
Monotypic Orthoptera genera